Osbaldeston is a civil parish in Ribble Valley, Lancashire, England.  It contains five listed buildings that are recorded in the National Heritage List for England.  Of these, three are at Grade II*, the middle grade, and the other two are at Grade II, the lowest grade.  The parish contains the village of Osbaldeston, and is otherwise rural.  The listed buildings consist of two country houses, a barn, a church with attached presbytery, and a school.

Key

Buildings

References

Citations

Sources

Lists of listed buildings in Lancashire
Buildings and structures in Ribble Valley